This is a selective list of scholarly works related to Muhammad Iqbal, the poet-philosopher of the Indian subcontinent.

The literature on Iqbal is extensive : critic Rauf Parekh, basing himself on the works of Prof Dr Haroonur Rasheed Tabassum, talks of at least 300 books while, when it comes to articles, a team from the KULeuven has referenced 2500 articles, keeping in mind that the bibliography stopped at 1998 and that they only concern items in Latin script (thus not Urdu and other Oriental languages where publications on Iqbal are more numerous.)

Books

Translations (English)

Translations (Spanish)

Translations (French)

Biography

Critical appreciation

Comparative studies

Iqbal and Pakistan movement

General books

Commentary

See also 
Index of Muhammad Iqbal–related articles

References

External links 
 
 
 
 
 
 
 

Bibliographies by writer
Bibliography
Bibliographies of Indian writers
Bibliographies of Pakistani writers
Poetry bibliographies
Philosophy bibliographies